Leo Alphonse Townsend (January 15, 1891 – December 3, 1976) was a pitcher for the Boston Braves from 1920 to 1921. He is the only major league pitcher to pitch more than 19 innings without a strikeout. He threw  innings.  Townsend had two wins, three losses, and a below-average 2.81 ERA.

References
 baseball-reference page

1891 births
1976 deaths
Major League Baseball pitchers
Boston Braves players
Baseball players from Alabama
Sportspeople from Mobile, Alabama
Pensacola Snappers players